Labour Party Black Sections (LPBS), commonly known as Black Sections, was a caucus in the United Kingdom, made up of African, Caribbean, and Asian Labour Party members from 1983 to 1993.

Formation
Since the 1960s, the Labour Party has relied for vital votes on Britain's large African, Caribbean, and Asian ("politically black") communities, its demographically most loyal supporters, in urban areas. Over time, black people stood in local council elections, and even as candidates for the Westminster Parliament. However, during the 1970s and early 1980s, these candidates were often put by Labour in seats where they stood no chance of winning.

The Labour Party Black Sections debate emerged in the context of African, Caribbean, and Asian voting patterns gaining prominence from 1974. The call for Black Sections among black Labour Party activists came from their realisation of the significance of black votes, particularly in areas with a high concentration of African Caribbean and Asian people. Black members active in the Labour Party argued for greater representation in return for the electoral support of their communities.

The English youth riots/uprisings that occurred at the start of the 1980s, in St Pauls, Bristol (1980) and in 1981, Brixton, Birmingham, Leeds, Manchester, Liverpool, and elsewhere, acted as a warning to a British society that was indifferent or hostile to the demands of disenfranchised and disadvantaged black people. These urban disturbances, that some commentators called "uprisings", provided black Labour activists (several of them middle-class professionals, observed black radical Darcus Howe, who wrote a Race Today pamphlet about Black Sections) with greater political leverage in their arguments. While the rise of the Labour municipal left wing, of prominent figures, including Ken Livingstone, in local government, particularly in London, created the opportunity to place the issue of black representation firmly on the political agenda.

Parallel organisations within the trade unions, such as the Nalgo Black Workers group in town halls, of Judy Bashir and Azim Hajee, the Black Trade Union Solidarity Movement, and Black Media Workers' Association, the latter two funded by the Livingstone-led Greater London Council, were set up prior to Labour Party Black Sections. There were two main approaches to the formation of Labour Party Black Sections. For supporters of the organisation, the rationale for its existence was the fact that although for decades more than eighty per cent of black people had voted Labour, this was not reflected in the party's policies, priorities, hierarchy or among its political representatives. Supporters argued Black Sections would act as a transmission belt to get more African, Caribbean, and Asian people into Labour membership and actively involved in decision-making and representative roles in the party. Black Sections challenged the party's historical record of neglect of black community concerns, including its passing in government of racist immigration laws. The Black Section's argument was, if its demands were agreed by Labour, the organisation would provide the party with the electoral support it needed in key inner-city seats. By organising as a section (caucus) within the party, African Caribbean, and Asian Labour Party members hoped to create a critical mass of black people required to change the party so that it could take account of their aims of greater political representation and the adoption of their Black Agenda, brought out by the Black Sections in 1988.

Responding to the growing weight of black demands, and the creation of new opportunities to voice them, white progressive Labour Party members backed their black fellow members to help them establish unofficial Black Sections. These were modelled on the party's already existing Women's Section and Young Socialists, and dozens of supportive Constituency Labour Parties (CLPs) sent motions backing Black Sections to the party's conference year after year, until the compromise Labour Party Black Socialist Society was agreed in 1990. Labour Party Black Sections were first mooted in 1981, after Britain's inner-city uprisings, to further African Caribbean and Asian representation within the Labour Party. Among its founding members were Diane Abbott, then a councillor in Westminster, Paul Boateng, a left-wing lawyer and the only black member of the Greater London Council, its first chair Russell Profitt, a Lewisham, south London, councillor, Billy Poh, a Vietnamese activist in Abbott's Westminster North, Paddington, west London, Constituency Labour Party (CLP), the office in which the Black Sections had its first base, and Marc Wadsworth, who became chair in 1985. Initially the party leader Neil Kinnock was said to have welcomed the idea, and in 1983, a composite motion (several CLPs had submitted Black Sections–supporting resolutions) setting out a framework for implementation by the National Executive Committee (NEC) was debated at party conference and then sent to the NEC for further consideration. After this, the NEC set up a "Positive Discrimination" working party to investigate the demand for Black Sections, which, recommended that they be made official, following its wide-ranging consultation among Constituency Labour Parties (CLPs), trade unions and socialist societies throughout the country, which favoured Black Sections, by a four-to-one majority. Positive discrimination were the preferred words of the influential left-wing Campaign for Labour Party Democracy, which had helped draft early Black Sections resolutions and circulated them among its extensive network of CLPs. Labour deputy leader Roy Hattersley, who was MP for the Birmingham Sparkbrook, a constituency with a large Asian party membership he feared would replace him if they were allowed to get organised, was bitterly against Black Sections. When Hattersley's left-wing CLP secretary Kevin Scally and Birmingham city councillor Amir Khan set up Sparkbrook Black Section, Hattersley had them expelled from Labour. But a vigorous national Black Sections campaign, fronted by Clare Short and supported by their Transport and General Workers' Union, then Britain's largest trade union, got them reinstated by party conference, against the wishes of Kinnock and Hattersley.
 
Despite powerful opposition from the Labour and trade union leaderships and a hostile news media, within a few years Black Sections had 35 branches, several of them in London, most sending "unofficial" delegates to their CLP party management and executive committees. On the back of the success of Black Sections, more than 200 African Caribbean and Asian Labour candidates were elected across the country in the 1986 council elections, a three-fold increase on their previous numbers.

But, frustrated by the lack of a single black MP in parliament, supporters around the country established an increasing number of Black Sections in CLPs and demanded change. This put pressure on the Labour leadership to tackle poor African Caribbean and Asian representation in the party and to focus its attention on policies that black communities wanted. The Black Sections also called for "all-black shortlists" – powered quotas to ensure black MPs were selected as prospective candidates and then elected to parliament, the same as all-women shortlists, which the Black Sections was the first to advocate, were used to redress the gender representational imbalance. Campaigners lobbied for the party's constitution to be amended to ensure Black Sections had representation in the party's decision-making bodies at every level, including on the party's ruling National Executive Committee, as was already the case for the trade unions, women, youth, and socialist societies, which included the Fabians and the Co-op Party.

History

In July 1984, the first national Black Sections conference was purposely held at Digbeth Hall, in Hattersley's Birmingham constituency. The MP was invited but refused the invitation. More than 300 mainly African Caribbean delegates attended. At the 1984 Labour Party autumn annual conference, 23 resolutions supporting Black Sections were tabled. At every national party conference between 1983 and 1989, Black Sections activists managed to get resolutions from CLPs all over Britain to amend Labour's constitution and advocate formally recognising Black Sections. But after it was agreed the first ones in 1983 should be remitted to the NEC without a vote, they were subsequently heavily defeated, after passionate debates, despite growing support from some large-  trade unions with their block votes in 1985, including the National Union of Public Employees, the largest health workers' union, and the National Union of Mineworkers. By 1986, more and more trade unions, under pressure from their black members, agreed Black Sections had a positive effect in building up black union membership. Indeed, some of them even set up their own black structures.

Many inner-city CLPs had Black Sections, despite Labour's refusal to make them official: the Black Sections 1986 Annual Conference reported that more than 30 CLPs had unofficial Black Sections. In the face of fierce Labour opposition, Black Sections members operated as if their group was legitimate, often with the support of their CLPs and branches (wards). Consequently, the relationship between the Black Sections and the Labour leadership was marked by public conflict and constant tension that generated bad publicity for the party.

Regardless, Black Sections achieved successes including four of its black supporters becoming London council leaders, four black MPs, and Bill Morris becoming the first black trade union general secretary. On top of that, black self-organised groups were formed in trade unions and by probation officers, teachers and students and even by police officers, who formed the National Black Police Association. The Trades Union Congress (TUC) created places on its general council and executive for black representatives.

Paul Boateng, Diane Abbott, Bernie Grant, Russell Profitt and Keith Vaz stopped acting as Black Sections activists when they were selected for safe or winnable seats in the 1980s. The 1987 general election bore the fruit of Black Sections' work in the form of the historic breakthrough of the four Black Labour MPs being elected (Boateng, Abbott, Grant, and Keith Vaz) from 12 prospective Parliamentary candidates. Though Black Sections chair Sharon Atkin, a Lambeth, south London, councillor, was deselected as the Nottingham East prospective Labour parliamentary candidate the same year, at the insistence of Kinnock. Responding to an anti-Labour black nationalist heckler, Bini Brown, Atkin had said, at a Black Sections public meeting in Birmingham, she would not want to represent "a Kinnock racist Labour party". Four Birmingham Labour MPs, led by Hattersley (the others were Robin Corbett, Terry Davis and Denis Howell), signed a letter, which they issued to the media, saying the meeting should not take place. It resulted in Bernie Grant not attending. The Black Sections issued a statement condemning the letter, stating there should be no apartheid-style pass laws, preventing the free movement of black people, in the UK. 

Until 1988, the dominant position within the Black Sections was one of demanding no less than Labour constitutional recognition as an official section of the party, to achieve parity with the existing Women and Youth Sections. This shifted after the 1987 general election to one of the Black Sections being prepared to consider proposals from the Labour leadership if they met Black Sections' general black self-organisation criteria. In 1988, Black Sections published the influential Black Agenda document after being urged by Race Today, Race and Class, of A. Sivanandan, and other radicals in African Caribbean and Asian communities, to state their policies.

Although Black Sections were established in CLPs around the country, they were not endorsed by the Labour leadership. The legitimate calls for fair representation made by black communities – whose electoral support was given overwhelmingly to Labour – were resisted by the party leadership of Neil Kinnock and Roy Hattersley, who wanted to defeat a rising left-wing rank and file the right-wing Conservative Party–supporting tabloid national newspapers denounced as the loony left. By 1987, Black Sections' founding principle of autonomous organisation within Labour was in doubt. In the face of the party's NEC backing a right-wing MP Gwyneth Dunwoody resolution, which threatened disciplinary action against future "separatist" activity, after the Black Sections arguably most successful conference, held in Nottingham, where its vice-chair Hassan Ahmed ran the largest Black Section outside London, the organisation was forced to go on the defensive. Six black prospective parliamentary candidates, who were Black Sections members, agreed with Labour not to subscribe to "statements of Black Sections policy" (the Black Agenda), which were different from the general party programme.

Clare Short, the left-wing Birmingham Ladywood MP, was one of the few white politicians to stand by Black Sections throughout its almost decade-long campaign. Despite the support for Black Sections, which, by then existed all over the labour movement, Labour still refused to recognise the organisation or and give it an official place in developing the party's race policies.

In 1989, Martha Osamor, deputy leader of Haringey council in north London, and a Black Sections leader, was chosen as the prospective parliamentary candidate by the Vauxhall CLP in south London. Again, Kinnock stepped in to block the selection of a Black woman he considered to be too left-wing to represent the party in parliament. Kate Hoey was imposed as the candidate by the national party instead. Osamor's daughter Kate Osamor went on to become an MP years later, for Edmonton, north London, and Martha Osamor was made a peer by her ally Jeremy Corbyn. 

In October 1990, at the Black Sections annual general meeting, Bernie Grant pointed out that the general political mood was one of retreat, the left was weak, and his view was the Black Sections' corresponding weakness meant it was time to be "pragmatic" and assess what would be achievable in such a climate. This stance, by one of its most prominent advocates, indicated that Black Sections was about to lower its horizons on the  very existence of the organisation and the official recognition it would pursue. Some Black Sections activists suspected that Grant and his fellow prospective parliamentary candidates were now less keen to rock the Labour boat now they had got what they wanted and were about to become MPs. Despite this scepticism, the official demand for Black Sections was replaced by the organisation's leadership accepting the compromise of a hybrid Black Socialist Society because they believed their original demand was no longer feasible. In 1990, the view which gained ascendancy was that Black Sections should continue to operate as a pressure group under its current constitution, actively develop a Black Socialist Society within the Labour Party and seek to win political leadership of it. To end its longest-running internal dispute of the 1980s, Labour finally agreed to change the party's constitution to embrace the Black Socialist Society.

During the 1990 conference a compromise was reached. Clarence Lusane writes:

In 1991, at the Black Sections' annual general meeting, it was acknowledged by national chair Mike Wongsam, summing up on behalf of the National Executive Committee, that enabling the Black Socialist Society would mean developing an organisation that would replace Labour Party Black Sections' influence within the Labour Party. Black Sections were disbanded and the Black Socialist Society was formed as a compromise between the party leadership and the organisation. This led to a split among Black Sections activists, with a minority rejecting a Black Socialist Society that they claimed would be half inside and half outside of the party, like the Labour head office-controlled  National Organisation of Labour Students. The dissidents unsuccessfully urged the organisation stick to its demand for Black Sections, which would be inside the party, like the women and youth sections.

Legacy
Many of the Black Sections leaders remained Labour Party members. In 1991, they formed the grassroots Anti-Racist Alliance, which helped set up the groundbreaking Stephen Lawrence campaign for justice.

In 1993, the Black Socialist Society was founded. Black Sections members joined to help set up local branches. The Black Socialist Society was supported by trade unions and Labour's Walworth Road headquarters, which ran its annual conferences. Key members of the Black Socialist Society's first national committee were members of the Black Sections: Kingsley Abrams, Palma Black, Marc Wadsworth, and Jatin Haria. An outcome of the Black Sections redefinition of autonomous organisation was to move black politics from the periphery and into the heart of municipal and parliamentary politics.

After the Black Socialist Society was defunct for more than a decade, because of the connivance with the antagonistic Labour headquarters of its trade union chair Gloria Mills, rewarded with a Commander of the Order of the British Empire (CBE) by the Queen of the United Kingdom, and treasurer Bob Purkiss, rewarded with an Member of Order of the British Empire (MBE), the organisation was reconstituted into BAME Labour in 2007, after meetings Keith Vaz and Chuka Umunna MP had with the Labour leadership. This kept Vaz on Labour's NEC as its representative for more than a decade before he stepped down as an MP after being involved in a scandal. The enfeebled version of the already compromised Black Socialist Society quickly became moribund. Jeremy Corbyn's revitalised socialist Labour Party promised to return it to the Black Sections heyday but, consumed by much bigger challenges, never did. Grassroots Black Left was set up in Nottingham in 2017 by Black Sections veterans Hassan Ahmed and Marc Wadsworth. It had a parliamentary launch the following year attended by Labour MPs, including Clive Lewis, Naz Shah, Mohammad Yasin, and Chris Williamson.

Notes

References

Footnotes

Bibliography

Further reading

 

1983 establishments in the United Kingdom
1993 disestablishments in the United Kingdom
Organisation of the Labour Party (UK)
Organizations established in 1993